Napier Marist are a football club from New Zealand based at Park Island in the Hawkes Bay region of the North Island and were formed in 1987 by a group of Napier based ex St John's College footballers. 

Napier Marist first entered the Central Federation League in 2019, previously having played in the Pacific Premiership. 

The club has competed for the Chatham Cup since 2004 and have reached the third round twice, in 2017 and 2019.

Honours
Rod Pelosi Challenge Trophy - 2007

References 

Association football clubs in New Zealand
1987 establishments in New Zealand
Sport in Napier, New Zealand